"Finnegan's Wake" is an Irish-American comic ballad, first published in New York in 1864. Various 19th-century variety theatre performers, including Dan Bryant of Bryant's Minstrels, claimed authorship but a definitive account of the song's origin has not been established. An earlier popular song, John Brougham's "A Fine Ould Irish Gintleman," also included a verse in which an apparently dead alcoholic was revived by the power of whiskey.

In more recent times, "Finnegan's Wake" was a staple of the Irish folk-music group the Dubliners, who played it on many occasions and included it on several albums, and is especially well known to fans of the Clancy Brothers, who performed and recorded it with Tommy Makem. The song has been recorded by Irish-American Celtic punk band Dropkick Murphys.

Summary
In the ballad, the hod-carrier Tim Finnegan, born "with a love for the liquor", falls from a ladder, breaks his skull, and is thought to be dead. The mourners at his wake become rowdy, and spill whiskey over Finnegan's corpse, causing him to come back to life and join in the celebrations. Whiskey causes both Finnegan's fall and his resurrection—whiskey is derived from the Irish phrase uisce beatha, meaning "water of life".

Hiberno-English phrases and terms
brogue (an Irish or Scottish accent)
hod (a tool to carry bricks in) (Slang term for a tankard or drinking vessel)
tippler's way (a tippler is a drunkard)
craythur (craythur is poteen (Poitín), "a drop of the craythur" is an expression to have some poteen)
Whack fol the dah (non-lexical vocalsinging called "lilting"; see Scat singing and mouth music. It is also punned upon repeatedly by James Joyce as Whack 'fol the Danaan'.)
trotters (feet)
full (drunk)
mavourneen (my darling)
hould your gob (shut up)
belt in the gob (punch in the mouth)
Shillelagh law (a brawl)
ruction (a fight)
bedad (an expression of shock)

Non-English phrases:
Thanam 'on dhoul (Irish: D'anam 'on diabhal, "your soul to the devil") However, in other versions of the song, Tim says "Thunderin' Jaysus."

Use in literature 

The song is famous for providing the basis of James Joyce's final work, Finnegans Wake (1939), in which the comic resurrection of Tim Finnegan is employed as a symbol of the universal cycle of life. As whiskey, the "water of life", causes both Finnegan's death and resurrection in the ballad, so the word "wake" also represents both a passing (into death) and a rising (from sleep), not to mention the wake of the lifeship traveling in between. Joyce removed the apostrophe in the title of his novel to suggest an active process in which a multiplicity of "Finnegans", that is, all members of humanity, fall and then wake and arise.

"Finnegan's Wake" is featured at the climax of the primary storyline in Philip José Farmer's award-winning novella, Riders of the Purple Wage.

Recordings 
Many Irish bands have performed Finnegan's Wake including notably:

The Clancy Brothers on several of their albums, including Come Fill Your Glass with Us (1959), A Spontaneous Performance Recording (1961), Recorded Live in Ireland (1965), and the 1984 Reunion concert at Lincoln Center.
The Dubliners on several live albums.
The Irish Rovers on their Greatest Hits album (1964-2014), "50 Years", and on their 1989 album "Hardstuff".
Dropkick Murphys on their albums Do or Die and Live on St. Patrick's Day From Boston, MA.
Brobdingnagian Bards on their album Songs of Ireland.
The Tossers on their album Communication & Conviction: Last Seven Years.
Orthodox Celts on their album The Celts Strike Again.
Ryan's Fancy on their album Newfoundland Drinking Songs.
Beatnik Turtle on their album Sham Rock
Christy Moore on his album The Box Set 1964–2004
LeperKhanz on the album Tiocfaidh Ár Lá (2005).
Schooner Fare on their album Finnegan's Wake
Woods Tea Company on their album The Wood's Tea Co. – Live!
Steve Benbow on his album Songs of Ireland
Johnny Logan on his album, The Irish Connection (2007).
Roger McGuinn in his Folk Den series.
Dominic Behan on his album Down by the Liffeyside
Poxy Boggards on their albums Barley Legal and Bitter and Stout
Seamus Kennedy on his album By Popular Demand
The High Kings on their albums Memory Lane and Live in Ireland
Derek Warfield on the album God Save Ireland (this recording is used repeatedly on the TV series iZombie)

References

External links

Finigans Wake Arranged by John Durnal and published in New York by John J. Daly. The date on the front is 1854, but the date inside is 1864, which may be the correct date.
'Finnegan’s Wake - Origins' (Brendan Ward on the origins of the song)
'Finnegan’s Wake - The Origin of the Species' (Brendan Ward on its authorship)
'Finnegan’s Wake - The Lyrics' (Brendan Ward compares differences in the earliest published lyrics)

1850s songs
Finnegans Wake
Irish-American culture
Irish folk songs
The Dubliners songs
Vaudeville songs